is a Japanese actress and singer. Since the 1960s, she has appeared in over 100 film and television roles, most prominently in the 1970s with her most famous roles as outlaw characters, best known for her performances in the film series Stray Cat Rock, Wandering Ginza Butterfly, Female Prisoner 701: Scorpion and Lady Snowblood. Kaji also performed as a singer, releasing records concurrently with her film career and beyond, even providing the official feature theme song tracks to a few of the films in which she also starred.

Career

Acting career
Meiko Kaji was born Masako Ōta in the Kanda area of Tokyo and graduated from the Yakumo Academy high school in Meguro, Tokyo. She began to work in the film industry under her real name at Nikkatsu studio in 1965 after graduating from high school. Her first supporting film role was in 1968 in Retaliation. In 1969 she appeared in Nihon Zankyoden, one of a series of films directed by Masahiro Makino, who recognized her acting ability and provided her with the stage name of Meiko Kaji. In 1970 she had a starring role in Blind Woman's Curse directed by Teruo Ishii, and from 1970 to 1971 she appeared in the Noraneko Rokku (Stray cat/Alleycat Rock) series of films about delinquent and rebellious young people and gangs, appearing in all five films in different character roles.

In 1971, Nikkatsu would move more towards production in the pink film business, which were more overtly sexual; and to avoid roles in such films, Kaji moved to the Toei Company. There she starred in the four-part Female Convict 701: Scorpion series of women in prison revenge films as Nami Matsushima/"Matsu the Scorpion", a woman sent to prison for seeking revenge and her attempts to escape, and in 1972 she first starred in the Wandering Ginza Butterfly yakuza/gangster series as Higuchi Nami.

In 1973 she starred in Lady Snowblood directed by Toshiya Fujita and distributed by Toho, a revenge film set in late 1800s Japan based on the manga of the same name, where she played the deadly assassin Yuki. It is considered by many critics to be her most famous role, particularly outside of Japan, and would later go on to inspire other media, including Quentin Tarantino's Kill Bill films. A year later she reprised her role as Yuki in the sequel Lady Snowblood 2: Love Song of Vengeance in 1974. She went on to appear in several of Kinji Fukasaku's films, such as Yakuza Graveyard in 1976 and in 1978 starred in Sonezaki Shinjū, where she earned nominations for Best Actress at five different award shows, winning four of them.

By the end of the 1970s, Kaji left major film roles following a combination of overwork amidst rampant production schedules and underpayment, but had occasional film roles in the 1980s and 2010s, including Under the Open Sky in 2020. She worked in television since the 1980s. In 1989 she portrayed the informant Omasa in the television drama Onihei Hankachō, the Shochiku–Fuji Television version starring kabuki actor Nakamura Kichiemon II.

During her acting career Kaji received acting offers from non-Japanese film studios, including those from Hollywood, but declined them, as she felt she could not give a good performance in a language other than Japanese.

Music career
Kaji is also a singer. She sang the theme song to Lady Snowblood, "Shura no Hana", and the theme song of the Female Convict Scorpion series, "Urami Bushi". When both these songs were used in the 2003 Quentin Tarantino film Kill Bill, there was a revival of interest in Kaji's music that encouraged her to resume her musical career. In 2009, she released a single, Onna wa yametai. In 2011, Kaji released her first new album in 31 years, Aitsu no suki-so-na burūsu with songs written by Ryudo Uzaki and Yoko Aki.

In May 2020, Kaji launched her own channel on YouTube, as a way to both celebrate her work with fans all over the world, and to give back to everyone who had supported her.

Filmography

Films 
 Retaliation (1968) (credited as Masako Ota)
 Outlaw:Gangster VIP 2 (1968)
 Blind Woman's Curse (June 1970, d. Teruo Ishii)
  (Oct. 1970)
 The Stray Cat Rock series (1970–71)
 Stray Cat Rock: Delinquent Girl Boss
 Stray Cat Rock: Wild Jumbo
 Stray Cat Rock: Sex Hunter
 Stray Cat Rock: Machine Animal
  (Jan. 1971, d. Toshiya Fujita)
 The Sasori series (1972–73)
 Female Prisoner 701: Scorpion
 Female Convict Scorpion: Jailhouse 41
 Female Convict Scorpion: Beast Stable
 Female Prisoner Scorpion: 701's Grudge Song
 The Gincho series (1972)
 Wandering Ginza Butterfly
 Wandering Ginza Butterfly 2: She-Cat Gambler
 Battles Without Honor and Humanity: Deadly Fight in Hiroshima (1973)
 Lady Snowblood (1973)
 Lady Snowblood 2: Love Song of Vengeance (1974)
 The Homeless (1974)
 New Battles Without Honor and Humanity: The Boss's Head (1975)
  (June 1976, d. Yasuzo Masumura)
 Yakuza Graveyard (1976)
 Double Suicide of Sonezaki (1978)
 Tree Without Leaves (1986)
 Onihei hankacho (1995)
 Oh! Oku (2006)
 Under the Open Sky (2020)
 The Voice of Sin (2020), Mayumi

Television 
 Ōedo Sōsamō (1970–71), Konami
 Ronin of the Wilderness (1972)
 Sasagawa Saho Matatabi Shirizu – Kuresakatouge e no chisou (1972), Oshizu
 Terauchi Kantarō Ikka (1974), Shizue Terauchi
 Sorekara no Musashi (1981), Yuri-hime
 Ōoku (1983)
 Kaseifu wa mita! 2 (1984)
 Aoi hitomi no seiraifu (1984)
 Sutaa tanjō (1985)
 Tantei Kamizu Kyōsuke no satsujin suiri 8: Izu Shimoda-kaigan ni akai satsui ga hashiru (1988), Shōko Hamano
 Aoi sanmyaku '88 (1988), Umetaro
 Onihei Hankachō(1989–2016),  Omasa
 Kenkaku Shōbai (1998–2010), Omon
 Kaseifu ha mita! 21 (2003), Mayumi Hirao
 Anata no tonari ni dare ka iru (2003), Shimako Matsumoto
 Kenkaku Shobai Sukedachi (2004) 
 Onihei Hankacho Supesharu: Yamabukiya Okatsu (2005) 
 Nogaremono orin (2006) 
 Hasshū mawari kuwayama jūbei (2007) 
 Kenkyaku shobai: Haru no arashi (2008) 
 Kekkon shinai (2012) 
 Joiuchi: Hairyo zuma shimatsu (2013)
 Taxi Driver no Suiri Nisschi 34 (2013)
 Samurai Rebellion (2013)
 Gokuaku Gambo (2014)
 Joshu Seven (2017)
 Tenshi ni Request wo (2020) (TV mini-series)
 What Did You Eat Yesterday? (2021) (TV mini-series)
 Modern Love Tokyo (2022)

Discography

Singles

Albums

Awards and nominations 
3rd Hochi Film Award 
 Won: Best Actress for The Love Suicides at Sonezaki

75th Mainichi Film Awards
 Won: Kinuyo Tanaka Award for her career

References

Further reading 
 Rikke Schubart: Super Bitches and Action Babes: The Female Hero in Popular Cinema, 1970–2006 (McFarland & Company, USA 2007) : Contains a chapter on Meiko Kaji.

External links 
 
 
 Yahoo Japan Profile 

1947 births
Living people
20th-century Japanese actresses
21st-century Japanese actresses
Japanese women singers
Actresses from Tokyo
Singers from Tokyo
People from Chiyoda, Tokyo